Paige Parenti-Gordon (born April 25, 1973, in North Vancouver, British Columbia) is a retired diver from Canada, who won the silver medal in the women's 3 metres springboard event at the 1991 Pan American Games in Havana, Cuba.

A member of the Vancouver Aquatic Centre Divers she represented her native country at two consecutive Summer Olympics, starting in 1992.

References

External links
sports-reference

1973 births
Sportspeople from North Vancouver
Olympic divers of Canada
Living people
Divers at the 1990 Commonwealth Games
Divers at the 1991 Pan American Games
Divers at the 1992 Summer Olympics
Divers at the 1994 Commonwealth Games
Divers at the 1996 Summer Olympics
Sportspeople from British Columbia
Commonwealth Games silver medallists for Canada
Canadian female divers
Pan American Games silver medalists for Canada
Commonwealth Games medallists in diving
Pan American Games medalists in diving
Universiade medalists in diving
Universiade silver medalists for Canada
Medalists at the 1991 Pan American Games
Medallists at the 1994 Commonwealth Games
Medallists at the 1990 Commonwealth Games